Swinton is a small village in the Harrogate district of North Yorkshire, England. It is situated to the immediate south-west of Masham and separated from it by the River Burn. The village is at the eastern end of  Swinton Park and shares a civil parish with Warthermarske.

The village is mentioned in the Domesday Book as belonging to Count Alan and the names derives from the Old English swīn-tūn which means Pig-Farm.

References

External links

Villages in North Yorkshire